Alexis Fontaine, known as Alexis Fontaine des Bertins (13 August 1704 – 21 August 1771) was a French mathematician. He was a patron and teacher of Jean-Jacques de Marguerie.

Life
Fontaine was born in Claveyson.  He first got a taste for maths by reading the Géométrie de l'infini of Fontenelle and gave solutions to the problems of the tautochrone curve, the brachistochrone curve and orthogonal trajectories. 
He was elected a member of the Académie des sciences in 1733.  He died, aged 67, in Cuiseaux.

Publications 
Mémoires donnés à l'Académie royale des sciences, non imprimés dans leur temps (1764)
Traité de calcul différentiel et intégral, par M. Fontaine, de l'Académie royale des sciences, pour servir de suite aux mémoires de la même Académie (1770)

Sources

External links 
Biography and bibliography
R Taton, Biography in Dictionary of Scientific Biography (New York 1970-1990).
J M C de Condorcet, Eloge de M Fontaine, Histoire de l'Académie royale des sciences 1771 (Paris, 1774), 105-116.J L Greenberg, Alexis Fontaine's route to the calculus of several variables, Historia Math. 11 (1) (1984), 22-38.
J L Greenberg, Alexis Fontaine's integration of ordinary differential equations and the origins of the calculus of several variables, Ann. of Sci. 39 (1) (1982), 1-36.
J L Greenberg, Alexis Fontaine's 'fluxio- differential method' and the origins of the calculus of several variables, Ann. of Sci. 38 (3) (1981), 251-290.

1704 births
1771 deaths
18th-century French mathematicians
Members of the French Academy of Sciences